William Hutchinson was an English professional footballer who played as an inside forward. He played for Alston before joining Football League Second Division side Burnley in August 1904. He played his only senior match for Burnley on 10 September 1904 in the 0–4 defeat away at Bolton Wanderers. Hutchinson left the club in 1904, and his whereabouts thereafter are untraced.

References

Year of birth missing
Year of death missing
English footballers
Association football forwards
Burnley F.C. players
English Football League players
Place of birth missing